Dichelina is a genus of crustaceans belonging to the monotypic family Dichelinidae.

The species of this genus are found in Western Europe, Malesia.

Species:

Dichelina phormosomae 
Dichelina seticauda

References

Crustaceans